Kristin Tattar (born 3 July 1992 in Pärnu) is an Estonian professional disc golfer  and former competitive cross-country skier. Tattar is Estonia’s most successful disc golfer of all time, and as of 2022 she has achieved the highest PDGA rating of any Estonian female. In 2022 she became the female disc golf world champion.

Biography
Kristin Tattar graduated from the Otepää branch of the Audentes Sports School in 2011.  After high school she went to Tartu and began studies at The Faculty of Law of the University of Tartu.

She is a former member of the Estonian youth ski team and a two-time Estonian skiing champion as a youth.  In 2011, Tattar gave up skiing due to ill health and started looking for new challenges. Three years later at age 22, she found disc golf and became a professional a year later.  In November 2017 she, together with life partner Silver Lätt, co-founded DG Academy, where both are coaches.  DG Academy offers disc golf instruction, as well as weekly training sessions.  They also work with course design and organization of various disc golf events and competitions.  Since 2018, Tattar has been fully committed to a career in disc golf, both as a competitor and representative, and through the company she co-founded with Lätt.  In 2021, her representative disc golf manufacturing company, Latitude 64° of Sweden signed her to a contract valued at up to $500,000 USD for  4 years.

Disc golf career

Tattar has been a member of the PDGA since 2015 and has competed in a large number of tournaments in Estonia, Europe, and the USA during the time.  According to the PDGA she has won more than one half of the events she has entered.

Tattar showed the potential for disc golf success from the very beginning.  In 2014 she took part in the Estonian championship for the first time and won first place and a gold medal.  From then on she won just about every title there is to be won in Estonia, including becoming a six-time women’s champion and a three-time doubles champion.

2018 Season and First Tour in The United States
In 2018 she embarked on her first tour of the USA, which represents the world’s best disc golfers (the Disc Golf Pro Tour), for part of the season. She participated in the Delaware Disc Golf Challenge and the US Women’s Disc Golf Championship, finishing 2nd and 4th respectively.

2019 Season and Second Tour in The United States
In 2019, Tattar decided to compete in even more events in North America, having her most successful year to up until that time.  During her tour she won first place in the Canadian Open, and also won the US Women’s Disc Golf Championship.  The latter win qualified her to compete against the men in the US Disc Golf Championship later that year.  She was the first European to win the US Women’s title.

2020 Season

Due to the COVID-19 pandemic, Tattar was regulated to only being able to compete in Europe.  During this season she competed in 7 events, winning 5 and placing 2nd in the other two.

2021 Season – All Top Five Finishes

The 2021 World Championships were scheduled to be held in Ogden, Utah in August.  In order to travel to the United States due to US requirements related to the COVID pandemic, Europeans needed to quarantine for a minimum of 14 days outside the Schengen area of Europe before they could receive appropriate travel visas.  For Tattar and other Estonians wishing to make it for the World Championships, this meant a minimum two week-stay in Croatia, away from family, before getting the opportunity to fly without restrictions to New York City and then on to Salt Lake City and Ogden.  She arrived just four days before the competition was to begin and on her first practice day for what was, in essence, her first big tournament of the year (Worlds), she became ill on the course due to a combination of travel fatigue (possibly jet lag) and unusually high temperatures in Utah for that time of year.  Given the circumstances she played reasonable well, placing 5th at the World Championships.  She then remained in North America for a 5 additional events tournament stretch, finishing 3rd at the Des Moines Challenge and winning the four other events – Clash at the Canyons V, Discraft’s CCR Open, Discraft’s Great Lakes Open (aka DGLO), and The Preserve Championships.  With an exciting signature win over 5-time World Champion Paige Pierce at DGLO, Tattar became one of the professional women favorites for every tournament she entered from that point forward.

2022 Season, World Champion
The 2022 season proved Tattar’s most successful to date.  She joined the Disc Golf Pro Tour full time beginning in February.  From her first event she built upon the previous season’s 6 straight top 5 finishes (among National Tour, Elite Series, Silver Series or Major level events).  In her first 8 events she finished no lower than 3rd place, winning the Memorial Championships, the  Jonesboro Open, and the Dynamic Discs Open.  An elbow injury sidelined Tattar for the middle part of the season, causing her to return to Estonia and nurse her elbow back to health.  She even was not able to compete in the two events where the DGPT moved into Europe for the first time, the Sula Open in Norway and the European Open in Finland.   Tattar returned to the US for the Ledgestone Open, finishing 3rd.  She followed with a win at Des Moines before prepping for the World Championships.  Tattar had the likely best tournament of her career at the World Championships, scoring three of her four highest-rated career rounds during the 5-round event, which she ultimately won in commanding fashion by 8 strokes.  By doing so, Tattar became the first mother, the first Estonian, and only the second European to win the title.  She then continued her streak of podium finishes through 5 more events, winning at the Butler County Classic, the Green Mountain Championships, and the Disc Golf Pro Tour Championships.  With her win at the DGPT Tour Championships, Tattar became the first pro disc golfer, man or woman, to have a yearly tournament winnings total over $100,000 USD.

2023 Season
Tattar began the 2023 pro season winning her first event at the Waco Annual Charity Open, coming back from 4 strokes down with 3 holes to play to win by 1 with a 30-foot wind putt on the final hole.  Her historic streak of podium finishes ended at the Open at Austin on March 19, when she placed 5th following a tough final round.  Her string of finishing no lower than 3rd place totaled 19 consecutive of the top tier tournaments from July of 2021 through March of 2023  .

Recognitions
In 2018, 2019, and 2021 the European Disc Golf Association chose her as the best female disc golfer of the year.  In 2022 she was named the Disc Golf Pro Tour's Female Player of the Year, with a unanimous vote of the media.

Sponsorship
Tattar has been a member of Team 64°, sponsored by Swedish disc golf equipment company Latitude 64° since she turned pro in 2014. She throws discs from Latitude 64, along with companion manufacturers Westside Discs and Dynamic Discs.

References 

1992 births
Living people
Disc golfers
Estonian female cross-country skiers
University of Tartu alumni
Sportspeople from Pärnu